Marian Ivan (born 1 June 1969 in Bucharest) is a retired Romanian footballer who played as a striker. Ivan made 3 appearances for the Romania national team.

External links

 

1969 births
Living people
Footballers from Bucharest
Romanian footballers
FC Brașov (1936) players
FC Dinamo București players
FC Sportul Studențesc București players
1994 FIFA World Cup players
Romania international footballers
Romanian expatriate footballers
Aris Thessaloniki F.C. players
Panionios F.C. players
AEP Paphos FC players
Liga I players
Cypriot First Division players
Super League Greece players
Expatriate footballers in Cyprus
Romanian expatriate sportspeople in Cyprus
Expatriate footballers in Hungary
Romanian expatriate sportspeople in Hungary
Expatriate footballers in Greece
Romanian expatriate sportspeople in Greece
Expatriate footballers in China
Association football forwards